Blood and Iron may refer to:

 Blood and Iron (speech), an 1862 speech given by Otto von Bismarck
 Hellboy: Blood and Iron, a 2007 animated film
 American Empire: Blood and Iron, a 2001 war novel by Harry Turtledove
 Blood and Iron, a 2006 novel by Elizabeth Bear
 "Blood and Iron", a song by Overkill from Feel the Fire

See also
 Iron & Blood: Warriors of Ravenloft